A microfilm reader is a device used in projecting and magnifying images stored in microform to readable proportions. Microform includes flat film, microfilm, aperture cards, microfiche, and ultra fiche. Using open reels or cassettes, microfilm is often used as a way to store many documents in a small space. It has become increasingly prevalent in the development of films, as well as storage of archived newspapers. With the invention of microfilm, microfilm readers soon developed. With the increasing popularity of computers, microform has decreased in use. However, many library archives still remain in microform.

Characteristics
A modern microfilm reader consists of:
A lens that is capable of magnifying the image on the film to at least the size of the original document. 
 An easily replaceable light source that provides illumination without damaging the microfilm.
Minimization of light effects of the room.
A screen large enough to project the entire film image.
An easily used loader for film rolls.
Provisions to rotate the image on the screen.
Readily accessible controls.
Minimization of the possibility of scratching or abrading the film.
Means of preparing enlargement easily.

Reader printers
A reader printer was developed in the mid 20th century. This reader printer allowed for the viewer to see the microfilm, but also print what was shown in the reader. The first of these devices was produced in World War II for use with V-Mail.

History
At the beginning stages in the development of microfilm, microscopes were used to view the microform documents. Early microfilms were visible under a 100x microscope, and only very expensive ones at the time were used to view the microfilms. One of the earliest readers of microfilm was the Coddington Magnifier. Developed by Sir David Brewster, this magnifier was a “simple plano-convex lens of such thickness that the focus of its spherical curvature coincides with the flat surface of the lens. On June 21, 1859, the first patent for a microfilm was issued to Rene Dargon in France. (Patent No. 23, 115) This early reader was small and compact, so much so that it could be fit into a gentleman’s wristwatch. On March 28, 1860, Dargon received a British Patent for the same invention, and on August 13 he received a US Patent. (No. 33,031)

Though Dargon owned the first patent, this is not to say that other inventors did not alter the first patent to create their own versions of the reader. However, Dargon sought to corner the market, and in 1861 he brought suit against a French inventor Martinache, charging invasion of patent. The trial that ensued was a short but bitter fight. The end result was a loss to Dargon, who went on to quickly issue an appeal. The court held up on the lower court decision revoking Dargon’s original patent and thus taking away the monopoly Dargon sought. Dargon sought to corner the market yet again, this time in a different manner, buying the Martinache for the price of $6,000, a substantial amount for the time.

On July 18, 1861, M. Berthier, an employee of Dargon received a Patent on a new process. This new reader consisted of “cementing a thick glass plate to each end of a small block of optical glass. The entire assembly was then placed in a grinding jig which transformed the flat end-plates into convex lenses, each focused on the image borne by the opposite plate. The end result was a cylinder of glass whose rounded ends acted as lenses.”

In 1868, French photographer Anguier created and patented a new process. This new process attached microphotos to a pair of Brewster magnifiers that were mounted on rubber. This process gave the illusion of related movement by applying pressure on the rubber mount. In 1890, an inventor by the name of Madsen was issued a patent on a Microfilm Camera (U.S. Patent 448, 447).

Implementation in libraries
By the end of the 19th century, a few libraries began to implement microfilm as a means of preserving records. A 1904 fire in the National Library of Turin that destroyed more than half the manuscripts stored there raised concerns of preservation of unique and rare materials. In 1905, these issues were addressed at the Congres International pour la reproduction des Manuscripts, des Monnaies et des Sceaux. It was decided that a photographic library would be established in all libraries. In 1956, UNESCO set up a special microfilm unit with the intention of visiting various countries to micro film books, documents, and other cultural material in danger of being destroyed and those which are irreplaceable. This special unit also trained technicians to handle microfilm. Microfilm readers are stored in special rooms known as “reading rooms,” with two prevalent types of readers. The first is for use of transparent microphotographs and the other used for micro opaque cards. In modern translucent microfilm readers, light is projected into a film producing an enlarged image of the film on a translucent screen, and in opaque readers the same process occurs except the image in on an opaque screen. In using a translucent screen, the image can be seen in daylight, provided no direct sunlight in on the screen. The opaque screen however, is cheaper to produce but requires a darker room.

Benefits
The advent of microfilm has had advantages to not only archiving documents but also spreading knowledge across nations. A United Nations Educational, Scientific and Cultural Organization report discussed the issues surrounding the implementation of microfilm internationally. As would be suspected, the report discussed the benefits of easy access to documents. The report also reported issues not on production of readers, stating that the production of reads was a simple and relatively low cost projects, but rather on the production of microfilm itself.

Gallery

References 

 Saffady, William. Micrographics. Libraries Unlimited, 1994.
 Spencer, Herbert and Reynolds, Linda. Factors affecting the acceptability of microforms as a reading medium. Readability of Print Research Unit Royal College of Art, 1976
 Borsa, Ivan. Feasibility study on the creation of an internationally financed and managed microfilming assistance fund to facilitate the solution of problems involved in the international transfer of archives and in obtaining access to sources of national history located in foreign archives. United Nations Educational, Scientific and Cultural Organization. 1981
 Gabriel, Michael R. and Ladd, Dorothy P. The Microfilm Revolution in Libraries. Jai Press Inc. 1980
 Plassard, Marie-France and Line, Maurice. The Impact of New Technology on Document Availability and Access. IFLA International Programme for UAP British Library Document Supply Centre. 1988
 Leisinger Jr, Albert H. Microphotography for Archives. International Council on Archives. 1968
 Luther, Frederic. Microfilm: A History. The National Microfilm Association Frederic Luther Company 1959
 Gunther, Alfred. Microphotography In The Library. United Nations Educational, Scientific and Cultural Organization. 1962

External links 

Storage media